"Wild Dances" is a single by Ukrainian singer-songwriter Ruslana. The song, representing , won the Eurovision Song Contest 2004 held in Istanbul with a score of 280 points. A Ukrainian-language version called "Dyki tantsi" was released in Russia and Ukraine.

In 2022, The Independent named it 55th best Eurovision-winning song of all time.

Background and composition
After qualifying second for the Eurovision Song Contest 2004, it scored a total of 280 points in the final, making it the first victory for Ukraine. With a mixture of English and Ukrainian lyrics, "Wild Dances" had the distinction of becoming the first Eurovision-winning song to be sung at least partly in a language other than English since the rule-change of 1999, when countries were allowed to sing in a language of their choosing, rather than one of their official languages. The song was remembered for an energetic performance, which Ruslana gave in a leather outfit, inspired by Xena: Warrior Princess and the ethnic tradition of Ukraine. The work on the song lasted for about three months. Editing and sound engineering was done by Ruslana together with specialists from Kyiv, London and New York City. The recording was done together with a guitarist from Cool Before, and an ex-trumpet player from Zdob și Zdub. Ukrainian and English lyrics of the song, as well as the chorus and melody, underwent significant changes since the initial stage. The song was bought with exclusive copyright in Vietnam by Vietnamese singer-songwriter Hồ Quỳnh Hương. She has an own Vietnamese version of the song, entitled "Vũ điệu hoang dã".

Usage in media 
The song is used in the soundtrack of the 2008 video game Grand Theft Auto IV. American gymnast and 2011 world champion Jordyn Wieber has revealed that she uses this song as her floor exercise music. The single was included on the official compilation album called The Very Best of Eurovision celebrating the 60th anniversary of the contest.

Track listing
Official versions
 "Wild Dances" [Ukrainian version radio edit] – 2:55
 "Wild Dances" [Album version] – 3:00
 "Wild Dances" [Ukrainian version Harem's pop mix] – 2:48
 "Wild Dances" [Harem's pop mix] – 2:48
 "Wild Dances" [Part II] – 3:58
 "Wild Dances" [Ukrainian version Harem's club mix] – 3:16
 "Wild Dances" [Harem's club mix] – 3:16
 "Wild Dances" [Ukrainian version Harem's percussion mix] – 2:52
 "Wild Dances" [Harem's percussion mix] – 2:52
 "Wild Dances" [Break mix] – 3:25
 "Wild Dances" [Groove mix] – 3:16
 "Wild Dances" [Instrumental version] – 3:00
 "Wild Dances" [Part II instrumental version] – 3:57

Music video
The official music video for the song was first aired on 6 May 2004 (before Eurovision) on MTV Russia in the 12 Angry Viewers show, but was booed by the audience. The shooting took place in the abandoned building of the Ice Palace, which was at once renamed 'The Iceberg Palace" by the members of Ruslana's crew because no heating equipment brought with Ruslana could heat the cold air of the huge building to a comfortable level. The building was 'decorated' with sheer concrete and windows without glass. Despite the script of the video-clip, which provided for constant burning fire in large barrels, torches on the stage, wireworks and even a real military flame thrower, only the "Wild Dances" could help people to ultimately warm up.

Cover art 
Photographer - Valerii Reshetniak

Charts

Weekly charts

Year-end charts

Sales and certifications

Release history

References

External links

Amazon.com about the single
Belgium 2004 year end chart.
Peak positions of Wild Dances

Ruslana songs
2004 singles
Number-one singles in Greece
Eurovision Song Contest winning songs
Eurovision songs of Ukraine
Eurovision songs of 2004
English-language Ukrainian songs
Songs written by Oleksandr Ksenofontov
2004 songs
EMI Records singles